Hostile Advances: The Kerry Ellison Story is a 1996 American made-for-television drama film based on Ellison v. Brady, a landmark sexual harassment case. This lawsuit set the precedent for the "reasonable woman" standard in sexual harassment law which allows for cases to be analyzed from the perspective of the complainant and not the defendant. The movie stars Rena Sofer and is directed by Allan Kroeker. Written by Layce Gardner and produced for Lifetime Television.

Plot

Kerry Ellison (Rena Sofer) has a good job at an office of the Internal Revenue Service. She is happy. All goes well, until Jack Gilcrest (Victor Garber) develops an interest in her. He starts stalking her—following her, and writing her sexually tense notes. Kerry makes it clear multiple times that she is not interested in him. Even when Kerry is transferred to another division, Jack's stalking does not diminish. He returns and threatens Kerry so much, she begins to get anxiety attacks. Kerry's bosses dismiss Jack's obsession as harmless, and her labor union refuses to deal with the problem. Kerry files a sexual harassment suit against her employers, who subsequently put her through hell.

Cast 
 Rena Sofer as Kerry Ellison
 Victor Garber as Jack Gilcrest
 Karen Allen as Margaret
 Maria Ricossa as Liz
 Réal Andrews as Joey Westley 
 Sean McCann as Mr. Ellison 
 Patricia Gage as Mrs. Ellison
 David Nerman as Sam 
 Bernard Behrens as Judge Gaffney
 Sherry Miller as Jean
 Richard Fitzpatrick as Hastings
 Karl Pruner as Alex
 Don Francks as Marty

See also
Sexual harassment
Stalking
North Country film about Jenson v. Eveleth Taconite Co., the first sexual harassment class action lawsuit

External links
 
Ellison v. Brady U.S. Court of Appeals document

1996 television films
1996 drama films
1996 films
Films about stalking
Films about sexual harassment
Lifetime (TV network) films
Films scored by Maribeth Solomon
Films scored by Micky Erbe
American drama television films
1990s American films